A page is an occupation in some professional capacity. Unlike traditional pages, who are normally younger males, these pages tend to be older and can be either male or female.

Workplace
Pages are present in some modern workforces. American television network NBC's page program is a notable example of contemporary workplace pages.

Libraries
Some large libraries use the term 'page' for employees or volunteers who retrieve books from the stacks, which are often closed to the public, and return books to shelves. This relieves some of the tedium from the librarians, who may occupy themselves with duties requiring their more advanced training and education.

Legislative pages
Many legislative bodies employ student pages as assistants to members of the legislature during session. Legislative pages are secondary school or university students who are unpaid or receive modest stipends. They serve for periods of time ranging from one week to one year, depending on the program. They typically perform small tasks such as running errands, delivering coffee, answering telephones, or assisting a speaker with visual aids. Students typically participate primarily for the work-experience benefits.

The following examples illustrate the range of legislative page programs:

Canada
The Canadian House of Commons Page Programme employs part-time first-year university students who work roughly 15 hours a week and are paid approximately $12,000 (CDN) for a one-year term. They perform both ceremonial and administrative duties and participate in enrichment activities such as meetings with MPs and government leaders. They also meet with student groups to explain the workings of the House of Commons and their duties as Pages. The Canadian Senate Page Program is similar.
The Legislative Assembly of Ontario employs 7th and 8th grade students for periods of two to six weeks during the legislative session. Participants must be high-achieving students who take leaves of absence from their schools while they serve as pages. Duties of pages include acting as messengers in the legislative chamber, taking water to MPPs, and picking up key documents (bills, petitions, motions, reports by committee). They also have opportunities to learn about provincial government and the lawmaking process.
The Legislative Assembly of Alberta employs high school and first-year university students, as a part-time job. Pages must demonstrate strong academic standing, have work experience and participate in extracurricular activities, and be able to commit to a job. Some duties of pages include distributing materials within the legislature, supporting public events such as Family Day and Canada Day, and participating in development seminars.

United States
Both houses of the United States Congress have or had formal page programs. The House program has ended but the Senate program continues; pages are high school juniors from throughout the country. The application process is very competitive. Pages serve for periods of several weeks during the summer or for a full school semester during term. They live in dormitories near the Capitol and attend special schools for pages, but are always present on the Senate and House floor during session to assist the proceedings as needed.
In the Virginia General Assembly the pages are young males and females ranging in age from 13 to 15. They assist Senators and Delegates with deliveries and errands.
The Nebraska Legislature has a page program, in which college students assist Senators and legislative staff with various deliveries and errands. The selection process includes an application and interview, with competitive candidates presenting a letter of recommendation from a member of the Legislature. Pages are employed by the Clerk of the Legislature, and often receive course credit for participating.

See also
 Page (servant)

References

Hospitality occupations
Personal care and service occupations